There are two comets named Ikeya–Seki: C/1965 S1 (this one), and C/1967 Y1, a.k.a. 1968 I, 1967n.

Comet Ikeya–Seki, formally designated C/1965 S1, 1965 VIII, and 1965f, was a long-period comet discovered independently by Kaoru Ikeya and Tsutomu Seki. First observed as a faint telescopic object on September 18, 1965, the first calculations of its orbit suggested that on October 21, it would pass just 450,000 km above the Sun's surface, and would probably become extremely bright.

Comets can defy such predictions, but Ikeya–Seki performed as expected. As it approached perihelion observers reported that it was clearly visible in the daytime sky next to the Sun. In Japan, where it reached perihelion at local noon, it was seen shining at magnitude −10. It proved to be one of the brightest comets seen in the last thousand years, and is sometimes known as the Great Comet of 1965.

The comet was seen to break into three pieces just before its perihelion passage. The three pieces continued in almost identical orbits, and the comet re-appeared in the morning sky in late October, showing a very bright tail. By early 1966, it had faded from view as it receded into the outer Solar System.

Ikeya–Seki is a member of the Kreutz sungrazers, which are suggested to be fragments of a large comet which broke up in 1106.

Gallery

Notes

References

External links 

Non-periodic comets
Kreutz Sungrazers
Science and technology in Japan
19650918
Discoveries by amateur astronomers
Great comets